is a Japanese politician who is a member of House of Representatives for the Tomorrow Party of Japan. He was formerly a member of the Democratic Party of Japan.

Born in Gamagōri, Aichi he graduated from Nihon University with a degree in economics. He was elected for the first time in 2003 after an unsuccessful run in 2000.

References

External links
 Official website in Japanese

Living people
1943 births
People from Gamagōri
Democratic Party of Japan politicians
Members of the House of Representatives (Japan)
Nihon University alumni
People's Life Party politicians
21st-century Japanese politicians